Kangas is a Finnish surname. Notable people with the surname include:

 Arttu Kangas (born 1993), Finnish athlete
 Jeanne Kangas (1940-2023), American lawyer and politician
 Jenni Kangas (born 1992), Finnish track and field athlete
 Joona Kangas (born 1997), Finnish freestyle skier
 Juhani Kangas (born 1998), Finnish professional footballer
 Karl Kangas (1886–1966), Finnish wrestler
 Kevin Kangas, American film maker
 Orvokki Kangas (1921–2000), Finnish politician
 Paul Kangas (1937–2017), American journalist
 Steve Kangas (1961–1999), American journalist

Finnish-language surnames